Events in the year 2022 in Guam.

Incumbents 
 Governor: Lou Leon Guerrero
 Lieutenant Governor: Josh Tenorio

Events 
Ongoing – COVID-19 pandemic in Guam
 November 8 –
 2022 Guamanian legislative election
 2022 Guamanian gubernatorial election
 November 5 – 2022 United States House of Representatives election in Guam

See also 
 History of Guam

References 

 
2020s in Guam
Years of the 21st century in Guam
Guam
Guam